Khana (Kana), or Ogoni proper, is the prestige variety of the Ogoni languages of Rivers State, Nigeria. It is the lingua franca of speakers of the East Ogoni languages. It is the most dominant of the 5 Ogoni  languages Khana, Tee, Gokana, Eleme, Baan spoken in southern part of Rivers State.

References

Indigenous languages of Rivers State
Ogoni languages